Captain Petko Voivode is a Bulgarian TV historical drama series released by the Bulgarian National Television in 1981, directed by Nedelcho Chernev, starring Vasil Mihaylov in the title role. The screenplay, written by Nikolay Haytov, is based on his namesake work from 1974 representing the biography of the Bulgarian haidouk and revolutionary Petko Kiryakov (1844-1900). At the beginning of each episode, the writer himself makes an introduction to the historical facts about the life and deeds of Petko.

The 12 episodes are divided into three parts named: Haidouk, Komitadji and Peaceful Life.

The production was intended for the celebrations of the 1300 anniversary of the Bulgarian state. The series obtain wide popularity. It turned Vasil Mihaylov into one of the superstars of the Bulgarian cinema and theatre of that time.

Episodes

Part one Haidouk
 The Revenge
 The Trap
 The Escape

Part two Komitadji
 Haidouk Tax
 Russia Arrived
 The Engagement
 Topographers

Part three Peaceful Life
 Return
 Meetings
 Iç Kale
 The Sworn Brother
 Petko le, kapitanine...

Cast
Vasil Mihaylov as Petko Kiryakov (Captain Petko Voivode)
Plamen Donchev as Little Petko (Petko Kiryakov's sworn brother)
Stoyan Gadev as Stoil
Prodan Nonchev as Vangelcho
Nikola Chipryanov
Dimitar Yordanov
Vasil Banov
Naum Shopov
Dzhoko Rosich
Stefan Iliev

References

External links
 
 Captain Petko Voivode at the Bulgarian National Television 

Bulgarian television series
1980s Bulgarian television series
Bulgarian drama television series
Historical television series
1981 Bulgarian television series debuts
Cultural depictions of military officers
Cultural depictions of politicians
Cultural depictions of Bulgarian men
Bulgarian National Television original programming